Alton Wayne Roberts (April 6, 1938 – September 11, 1999) was a Klansman convicted of depriving slain activists Michael Schwerner, Andrew Goodman and James Chaney of their civil rights in 1964. He shot two of the three civil rights workers before his accomplices buried their bodies in a dam.

Early life
Roberts had a younger brother by the name of Raymond.  Roberts played football during high school.

Roberts, then 26 years old, owned a bar in Meridian, Mississippi, at the time of the murders.

Freedom Summer Murders

In the afternoon of June 21, 1964, Chaney, Goodman, & Schwerner arrived at Longdale to inspect the burned out church in Neshoba County. They left Longdale around 3 p.m. They were to be in Meridian by 4 p.m. that day. The fastest route to Meridian was through Philadelphia. At the fork of Beacon & Main Street their station wagon sustained a flat tire. It is possible that a shot was fired at the station wagon's tire. Sheriff Lawrence A. Rainey's home was near the Beacon & Main Street fork. Deputy Cecil Price soon arrived and escorted them to the county jail. Price released the trio as soon as the longest day of the year became night which was about 10 p.m. The three were last seen heading south in their Ford station wagon along Highway 19 toward Meridian.

Two Mississippi Highway Patrol men waited at Pilgrim's Gas Station not far from Philadelphia's city limits. The trio was likely deferred from using a phone at the station. They drove past the station and continued toward Meridian.

Lynch mob

The lynch mob, in Horace D. Barnette's and Billy W. Posey's cars, was drinking while arguing who would kill the three men. Eventually Philadelphia Police Officer Other N. Burkes drove up to Barnette's car and told the mob that "they're going on 19 toward Meridian. Follow them!" After a quick rendezvous with Philadelphia Police Officer Richard Willis, Price was in pursuit of the three civil rights workers. Posey's Chevrolet carried Jerry M. Sharpe, Jimmy L. Townsend, and Alton W. Roberts. Horace Barnette had a two-toned blue Ford Fairlane sedan. In Horace's car were James Jordan, Jimmy K. Arledge, Jimmy Snowden, Roberts, and Posey. Posey's car apparently had carburetor problems and broke down on the side of the road. Sharpe and Townsend were ordered to stay with the car and get it running again. Price eventually caught the CORE station wagon heading west toward Union, Mississippi, on state highway 492.

Soon the three civil rights workers would be escorted north on Highway 19 to secluded Rock Cut Road where they would be executed at the hands of Roberts and Jordan.

When they arrived, Roberts reportedly pulled Schwerner out of the car, pointing a gun at his chest. "Are you that nigger lover?" Roberts asked, his left hand on Schwerner's shoulder.  "Sir, I know just how you feel," Schwerner replied.  Roberts then shot him in the heart and then grabbed Goodman, shooting him in the chest near his right shoulder.  Chaney ran, but Roberts along with other Klansmen were able to shoot him dead before he could run any farther.  Roberts fired into Chaney's lower back and his head. Prosecutors said that Roberts fired two of the three bullets found in Chaney's body. After the murders James Jordan was accused of saying "well, you didn't leave me nothing but a nigger, but at least I killed me a nigger."

Conviction

On December 4, 1964, The Federal Bureau of Investigation arrested several men for engineering a conspiracy to injure, oppress, threaten, and intimidate Chaney, Goodman, and Schwerner.  Roberts was one of many rounded up that day.

Roberts was indicted on February 28, 1967. He went to federal trial in Meridian on October 7 of that same year; 13 days later, he was convicted.  At the sentencing hearing on December 29, 1967, Judge William Harold Cox sentenced Roberts to 10 years in federal prison.  Roberts served no more than six years in McNeil Island Corrections Center, and was free on appeal bond.

Encounter with Laurens Pierce
Roberts gained national recognition on January 27, 1965, when Jack Thornell took photos of him beating up CBS cameraman Laurens Pierce outside the federal courthouse in Meridian where he was on trial at the time.  Roberts' encounter with Pierce was mentioned in the press the next day.

Personal life
Along with owning a bar, Roberts was also a window salesman and a mobile home salesman.

According to People, Roberts was running a seedy after-hours bar in 1989. The bar was located on Virginia Drive in Meridian, Mississippi.

See also

 Samuel Bowers
 Olen Lovell Burrage
 Edgar Ray Killen
 Cecil Price
 Lawrence A. Rainey
 Jimmy Snowden
 Herman Tucker
 Civil Rights Movement
United States v. Price

References

External links
 

1938 births
1999 deaths
American Ku Klux Klan members
American people convicted of murder
Criminals from Mississippi
People convicted of depriving others of their civil rights
People convicted of murder by the United States federal government